Habibullah also spelled Habib Ullah, Habibollah, Habeeb-Allah etc., is a male Muslim given name meaning in Beloved of God, stemming from the male form of the name Habib. It may refer to:

People

Raja Sir Chulan ibni Almarhum Sultan Abdullah Muhammad Shah Habibullah, known as Raja Chulan (1869–1933), member of the Perak royal family (Malaya)
Habibullah Khan, Emir of Afghanistan
Muhammad Habibullah (1869–1948), Indian nobleman and statesman
Habibullah Khan (1872–1919), King of Afghanistan
Habibullāh Kalakāni (ca. 1890–1929), Emir of Afghanistan
Khwaja Habibullah (1895–1958), Nawab of Dhaka
Habibullah Khan Tarzi (born 1896), Afghan diplomat
Khan Habibullah Khan (1901–1978), Pakistani politician and High Court judge
Habibullah Bahar Chowdhury (1906–1966), politician and writer from East Bengal
Amir Habibullah Khan Saadi (1909–1989), Indian freedom fighter and Pakistani politician
Habibullah Khan Khattak (1913–1994), Pakistani military officer
Habibollah Hedayat (born 1917), Iranian nutrition scientist
Habibollah Asgaroladi (born 1933), Iranian politician
Habibollah Peyman (born 1935), Iranian politician
Kabibulla Dzhakupov (born 1949), Kazakh Politician 
Habibullah Qaderi (born 1961), Afghan politician
Noor Habib Ullah (born 1980), Afghan held in Guantanamo
Habibollah Akhlaghi (born 1987), Iranian wrestler
Habibullah (Bagram detainee) (died 2002), Afghan who died in US custody
Khalid Mobarak Habeeb-Allah Alqurashi (died 2004), Saudi alleged terrorist
Habibullah Jan (died 2008), Afghan politician
Habibollah Bitaraf, Iranian politician
Habibullah Karzai, Afghan politician
Hasbi Habibollah, Malaysian politician
Habibollah Latifi, Iranian Kurdish political activist
 Habibullah Qurayshi (1865-1943), Bengali Islamic scholar
, Iranian Shia cleric
, Iranian politician

With derived name
Zuhur Habibullaev (born 1932), Tajik artist
Nikolai Khabibulin (born 1973), Russian ice hockey player, goaltender for the Edmonton Oilers

Places
Garhi Habibullah, town in Pakistan

See also
Habib
Habibi (disambiguation)

Arabic masculine given names